The 2008 Colo-Colo season players and competition. "Club Social y Deportivo Colo-Colo" is a Chilean professional football club based in Macul, Santiago, founded in 1925.

Players

Squad information

Transfers

Apertura
In
 Lucas Barrios from  Atlas (On Loan)
 Ricardo Rojas from  América
 Daniel González from  O'Higgins
 José Domingo Salcedo from  Racing Club de Avellaneda
 Cristobal Jorquera from  Unión Española (Loan return)
 Fernando Meneses from  Cobreloa (Loan return)
 Raúl Olivares from  Santiago Morning (Loan return)
 José Pedro Fuenzalida from  Universidad Católica
 John Jairo Castillo from  Guaros FC
 Carlos Eduardo Salazar from  Deportes Tolima
Out
 Giovanni Hernandez to  Atlético Junior
 David Henriquez to  Dorados de Sinaloa
 Miguel Aceval to  Defensor Sporting
 Rodrigo Millar to  Once Caldas
 Claudio Bieler to  LDU Quito
 David Henriquez to  Dorados de Sinaloa
 Boris González to  Universidad Católica
 Richard Leyton to  Puerto Montt (Loaned)
 Ariel Salinas to  Unión San Felipe (Loaned)
 Juan Pablo Arenas to  Deportes Melipilla (Loaned)

Clausura
In
 Macnelly Torres from  Cúcuta Deportivo
 Daud Gazale from  Deportes Concepción
 Gerardo Cortés from  Deportes Concepción
 Juan Gonzalo Lorca from  Vitesse Arnhem
 Luis Pedro Figueroa from  Cobreloa
 Rodrigo Millar from  Once Caldas
Out
 José Luis Cabión to  Everton
 John Jairo Castillo to  Everton
 Eduardo Rubio to  FC Basel
 Carlos Eduardo Salazar to  Deportivo Pereira
 Gerardo Cortés from  Deportes Concepción
 Gustavo Biscayzacu to  Club Necaxa
 José Pedro Fuenzalida to  O'Higgins
 Rafael Caroca to  O'Higgins
 Daniel González to  Cobreloa (loan)
 Fernando Meneses to  Universidad de Concepción (loan)
 Boris Sagredo to  Palestino (loan)
 Gonzalo Fierro to  Flamengo

Pre-season and friendlies

Competitions

Torneo Apertura

Regular season table
Group 3

Regular season matches

Play-offs
Quarter-finals

Semi-finals

Finals

Torneo Clausura

Regular season table
Group 1

Regular season matches

Play-offs
Quarter-finals

Semi-finals

Finals

Copa Chile

Copa Libertadores

References

2008
Colo
Chilean football clubs 2008 season